The following are the national records in athletics in Niue maintained by Niue's national athletics federation: Niue Athletics Association.

Outdoor

Key to tables:

ht = hand timing

# = not ratified by federation

Men

†: result obtained during the decathlon.
‡: 4,655 pts by another source.

Women

†: result obtained during the pentathlon.

Indoor

Men

Women

References

External links

Niue
Records